Lectionary 245, designated by siglum ℓ 245 (in the Gregory-Aland numbering) is a Greek manuscript of the New Testament, on parchment. Palaeographically it has been assigned to the 9th century. 
The manuscript has survived on only two leaves.

Description 

The codex contains lessons from the Gospels lectionary (Evangelistarium) and from the Book of Psalms.
The first leaf contains lesson from Psalm 65, the second leaf with lesson from the Gospel of John.

The text is written in Greek uncial letters, on 2 parchment leaves, in two columns per page, 20 lines per page.

History 

It has been assigned by the Institute for New Testament Textual Research to the 9th century.

Constantin von Tischendorf brought the manuscript from the East and gave first description of it. It was examined by Eduard de Muralt.

The manuscript was added to the list of New Testament manuscripts by Gregory (number 245).

The manuscript is not cited in the critical editions of the Greek New Testament (UBS3).

The codex is housed at the Russian National Library (Gr. 36) in Saint Petersburg.

See also 

 List of New Testament lectionaries
 Biblical manuscript
 Textual criticism
 Lectionary 246

Notes and references

Bibliography 

 Constantin von Tischendorf, Anecdota sacra et profana, p. XIV, 6
 Eduard de Muralt, Catalogue des manuscrits grecs de la Bibliothèque Impériale publique (Petersburg 1864), p. 22 (as XXXVII)

Greek New Testament lectionaries
9th-century biblical manuscripts
National Library of Russia collection